Petros (pronounced pee-tross) is an unincorporated community and census-designated place (CDP) in Morgan County, Tennessee, United States, located on State Route 116. Its population was 583 as of the 2010 census. Petros has its own post office, with the ZIP code 37845.

Petros is historically a coal mining town and is also the home of (the now closed) Brushy Mountain State Penitentiary.  Some of the town and coal mine scenes for the movie October Sky were filmed there. Also home to  Petros Joyner  school

Demographics

References

External links

Photos from TNGenWeb

Census-designated places in Morgan County, Tennessee
Unincorporated communities in Tennessee
Census-designated places in Tennessee
Mining communities in Tennessee
Coal towns in Tennessee
Unincorporated communities in Morgan County, Tennessee